Swanton Abbott is a village and civil parish in the district of North Norfolk.

The villages name means 'Herdsmen's farm/settlement'. The village was granted to the Abbot of St. Benet Holme by King Cnut.

Amenities
It is served by St Michael's church in the ecclesiastical parish of Worstead. A Wesleyan Reform Union Chapel opened in 1856.

Swanton Abbott Community Primary School is a co-educational school for children from 4–11 years.

There were two public houses in the village, the Jolly Farmers and the Weavers Arms. The Weavers Arms closed around 2003 and the Jolly Farmers closed in 2010 but re-opened in 2011 under new management.

References 

http://kepn.nottingham.ac.uk/map/place/Norfolk/Swanton%20Abbot

External links

Swanton Abbott 1875-1975

North Norfolk
Villages in Norfolk
Civil parishes in Norfolk